Leonia Janecka, born Leonia Nadelman (20 July 1909 – 2 January 2003), was a Polish painter and illustrator. Her work was part of the art competitions at the 1928 Summer Olympics and the 1932 Summer Olympics.

References

Further reading
 Barbara Gawryluk, Ilustratorki, ilustratorzy. Motylki z okładki i smoki bez wąsów, Marginesy, Warszawa 2019.
 Anita Wincencjusz-Patyna, Stacja Ilustracja. Polska ilustracja książkowa 1950-1980. Artystyczne kreacje i realizacje, Akademia Sztuk Pięknych im. Eugeniusza Gepperta we Wrocławiu, Instytut Historii Sztuki Uniwersytetu Wrocławskiego, Wrocław 2008.

1909 births
2003 deaths
20th-century Polish painters
Polish women painters
Olympic competitors in art competitions
Artists from Warsaw
20th-century Polish women